Quercus humboldtii, commonly known as the Andean oak, Colombian oak or roble, is a species of oak found only in Colombia and Panamá. It is named for Alexander von Humboldt.

Description
Its bark is reddish gray or gray and fissured, breaking into squares and flaking. The flowers are small, yellow, and unisexual, with a racemic inflorescence. Male flowers are numerous, with long-styled female flowers in a cupula. Only one fruit per cupule is developed, and the inside of the acorn shell is woolly.

Distribution and habitat 
It is found on all three Colombian Andean mountain ranges and some lowland inter-Andean regions.

The tree grows in the Andean highlands where the mean annual temperature is 16−24 °C, and the mean annual rainfall . It can be found in moderately fertile and deep soils as well as in degraded soils, preferring shallow soils with a thick layer of humus. The acorns provide important food for wildlife; two parrots – the rusty-faced parrot and Fuertes's parrot – are endemic to the threatened montane ecosystems of the Colombian Andes and are particularly dependent on the Andean oak forests as a home.

References

humboldtii
Trees of Central America
Trees of northern South America
Flora of Colombia
Flora of Panama
Plants described in 1809
Taxa named by Aimé Bonpland
Flora of the Andes
Flora of the northwestern Andean montane forests